Sitakot Vihara ( Sitakot Vihara)is an archaeological site located in Nawabganj upazila in Dinajpur district of Bangladesh. The site is locally known as the residence of Sita. Through regular excavations in the years 1968 and 1972–1973, an ancient Buddhist monastery was discovered in the site. The monastery dates from a similar time period to the nearby Somapura Mahavihara and Halud Vihara.

Architecture

The monastery was built on a square area of 65 meters.

On the northern and southern sides there was large open space inside the boundary. The outer gateway was in the northern side and there were two guard rooms inside the boundary. The inner gateway entered to an entrance hall. The hall is attached with monastic cells.  There were 41 cells in this monastery: 8 in the northern wing and 11 cells each in the three other wings. The cells were almost equal in size (3.66 m by 3.35 m). The thickness of the front walls of the cells were 1.07 m, back walls 2.59 m and partition walls 0.91-1.22 m. Each cell has a doorway in front side and niches on three side walls.

A 2.59 meter wide verandah ran through the perimeter of the monastery and the cells were connected to it through a doorway of 1.68 meter length and 1.07 meter width.

There is a courtyard in the middle of the monastery that measure 42.38 meter *41.16 meter. Three rooms located in the middles of east, west and south wings were used as prayer rooms.

Artifacts found
Two bronze images were found on the site. One is of Bodhisattva Padmapani and the other of Bodhisattva Manjushri. Ink pots, terra cotta toys, ornamental bricks, and a lot of pot shards were also unearthed during the excavation.

Protection
The site is under protection of the Department of Archaeology and Museums, Government of Bangladesh. The site is not well maintained and restoration work is needed.

See also
 Somapura Mahavihara
 Halud Vihara

Gallery

References

Dinajpur District, Bangladesh
Archaeological sites in Dinajpur district